The National Amalgamated Labourers' Union (NALU) was a trade union representing unskilled labourers in the United Kingdom.

The union was founded in 1889, initially based in Cardiff, and later in Swansea.  Its membership long varied between 3,000 and 4,000, although by the 1910s, it was over 5,000.

The union affiliated to the National Transport Workers' Federation, and in 1922 it merged into the Transport and General Workers' Union.

General Secretaries
1889: Thomas Davies
1890s: Harry Williams
1909: John Twomey

References

Defunct trade unions of the United Kingdom
Transport and General Workers' Union amalgamations
Trade unions established in 1889
Trade unions disestablished in 1922
Trade unions in Wales